Raghvendra Pratap Singh is an Indian politician and a member of 17th Legislative Assembly of Uttar Pradesh of India. He represents the Domariyaganj (Assembly constituency) in Siddharthnagar district of Uttar Pradesh and is a member of the Bharatiya Janata Party.

Early life and education
Singh was born 1 April 1966 in Basti district of Uttar Pradesh to father Shankar Baksh Singh. In 1987, he married Vijay Laxmi Singh, they have one son and one daughter. He belongs to General Class (Kshatriya) community. In 1986, he attended Deen Dayal Upadhyay Gorakhpur University and attained Bachelor of Arts degree.

Political career
Singh started his political career in 16th Legislative Assembly of Uttar Pradesh (2012) elections, he contested from Domariyaganj (Assembly constituency) as a member of Bharatiya Janata Party. But he lost this election to Peace Party candidate Malik Mohd Kamal Yusuf and stood on fourth position with 25,209 (14.26℅) votes.

In 17th Legislative Assembly of Uttar Pradesh (2017) elections, he was elected MLA from Domariyaganj by defeating Bahujan Samaj Party candidate Saiyada Khatoon by a margin of 171 votes (lowest margin in 2017 assembly election).

Posts held

References

Uttar Pradesh MLAs 2017–2022
Bharatiya Janata Party politicians from Uttar Pradesh
Living people
People from Siddharthnagar district
1966 births
Deen Dayal Upadhyay Gorakhpur University alumni